The Association for the Study of Persianate Societies (Persian: انجمن مطالعات جوامع فارسی زبان), also known as ASPS, is an academic institution for researchers and scholars interested in the culture and civilization of the Persian-speaking societies and related areas. The association's head office is based in New York. ASPS is one of the partner organisations of Middle East Studies Association of North America.

History
The Association for the Study of Persianate Societies was founded by Saïd Amir Arjomand in 2002. He was also the first president of the association. Amir Arjomand was followed by Parvaneh Pourshariati and Rudi Matthee. The current president of ASPS is Sunil Sharma, professor of Persian & Comparative Literature at Boston University.

Journal and conference
ASPS' "Journal of Persianate Studies" is published by Brill in the Netherlands. The association also organises a biennale International conference. Up to now the conferences have been held in Tajikistan, Turkey, Bosnia and Herzegovina, India, Pakistan, Georgia and Armenia. The 2020 conference was canceled due to the Corona crisis.

References

External links
Official Website (in English)
Development of Persian Sufism by Prof. Amir Arjomand; Opening of ASPS 2018 Conference in Tbilisi (Video)
ASPS Conference in Georgia (BBC Persian Service)
Iranian studies
Middle Eastern studies in the United States
2002 establishments in the United States
Organizations established in 2002
Persian studies